Cross–McKusick–Breen syndrome (also known as "Cross syndrome", "hypopigmentation and microphthalmia", and "oculocerebral-hypopigmentation syndrome") is an extremely rare disorder characterized by white skin, blond hair with yellow-gray metallic sheen, small eyes with cloudy corneas, jerky nystagmus, gingival fibromatosis and severe intellectual disability and physical retardation.

It was characterized in 1967.

See also 
 Oculocerebrocutaneous syndrome
 List of cutaneous conditions

References

External links 

Disturbances of human pigmentation
Genetic disorders with OMIM but no gene
Rare syndromes